Adrian Bachmann (born 12 July 1976) is a Swiss sprint canoer who competed in the early 2000s. At the 2000 Summer Olympics in Sydney, he was eliminated in the semifinals of both the K-1 500 m and the K-1 1000 m events.

References
Sports-Reference.com profile

1976 births
Canoeists at the 2000 Summer Olympics
Living people
Olympic canoeists of Switzerland
Swiss male canoeists